EMTV is a commercial television station in Papua New Guinea. Until the launch of the National Television Service in September 2008, it was the country's only free to air television service.

It is owned by Telikom PNG through a subsidiary Media Niugini. It was previously owned by Fiji Television Limited and Nine Network Australia.

History

The station commenced broadcasting in July 1987 in Port Moresby. In April 1988, the station opened relays in Lae, Mt. Hagen, Goroka, Arawa and Rabaul. The next year, the Post and Telecommunications Department (PTC) made a microwave bearer available for live transmission in Lae, Mt. Hagen, Goroka and Madang.

In November 1993, EMTV moved off the PTC's bearer, and transferred program distribution to a satellite system. The current satellite footprint allows the signal to be seen within all of PNG, and as far away as Pakistan, India, Australia, New Zealand and Fiji.

Today, EM TV operates two transmitters in Port Moresby, and leases and maintains six downlink and retransmission centres in Lae, Rabaul, Mt Hagen, Goroka, Madang and Kavieng. Other groups such as mine sites, cable operators and local community groups have set up their own satellite receivers and redistribute the signal in areas such as Pogera, Ok Tedi (Tabubil), Misima, Lihir, Kutubu, Wewak, Kimbe, Popondetta, Manus and many other smaller areas.

Previous Affiliateship with Nine Network

EMTV was previously owned by the Nine Network Australia, from where most of its shows, idents, slogans and ads were sourced. One of the most recognisable Nine Network affiliteship flag was EMTV's 2004 ident, which used Nine's 'Still the One' music, first used by ABC in the United States in 1976. This ident is still in use today, despite EMTV dropping its affiliateship with Nine in late 2006 when it was sold to Fiji Television Limited, leading to a slowdown in the network's quality of television, and the dropping of Nine's American television lineup. EMTV continues to host many shows produced by Nine, as it still shows Nine's Australian shows through 2009, including Domestic Blitz, the Today Show, and RPA.

After the split, EMTV began showing other shows such as The Simpsons, Grey's Anatomy, Army Wives, Neighbours and 24, which are held by Nine's rivals, Network Ten and the Seven Network.

News and Current Affairs
EMTV's news flagship is EMTV News, and is telecast daily from 6pm. They show locally made news reports. Being Papua New Guinea's only commercial station, EMTV controls a major aspect of news in the country.

External links
Official website

References

Communications in Papua New Guinea
Mass media in Papua New Guinea
Television channels and stations established in 1987
Television stations in Papua New Guinea